The 2006 Russian Figure Skating Championships took place in Kazan from December 25 to 29, 2005. Skaters competed in the disciplines of men's singles, ladies' singles, pair skating, and ice dancing. The results were one of the criteria used to pick the Russian teams to the 2006 Winter Olympics, the 2006 World Championships, and the 2006 European Championships. The team to the 2006 World Junior Championships were picked at the 2006 Russian Junior Figure Skating Championships.

Senior results

Men

Ladies

Pairs

Ice dancing

Junior results
The 2006 Russian Junior Figure Skating Championships, used to determine the teams to the 2006 World Junior Championships were held on January 26–29, 2006 in Nizhny Novgorod.

Men

Ladies

Pairs

Ice dancing

External links
 2006 Russian Championships
 2006 Russian Junior Championships

2005 in figure skating
Russian Figure Skating Championships, 2006
Figure skating
Russian Figure Skating Championships